Martin Maxwell Fleming Luckie  (30 January 1868 – 3 July 1951) was a New Zealand cricketer who played two matches of first-class cricket 29 years apart – one in 1891 and the other in 1920. He became a prominent cricket administrator and a city councillor in Wellington. He was twice deputy mayor: from 1929 to 1931, and again from 1936 to 1947.

Biography

Early life and career
Luckie was born on 30 January 1868 in Nelson. He worked as a barrister and solicitor in Wellington.

Cricket career
Luckie played first-class cricket for Wellington in 1891 and 1920. He was primarily a left-arm slow bowler. He played lower grade cricket when his senior days were over and did not retire from active play until he was 70 years old. He later served as President of the Wellington Cricket Association.

The Wellington City Council named Martin Luckie Park after him which houses playing fields for both cricket and soccer.

Local politics
Luckie served two separate terms as a Wellington city councillor. In 1913 he won a seat on the council on a Citizens' League ticket which he was to hold until 1931 when he did not seek re-election as a councillor. That year he stood for Mayor of Wellington as an independent against Thomas Hislop. He polled well but lost. In 1933 he made a return to local-body politics and spent another spell on the council until he retired in 1947.

He stood for parliament as the Reform Party's candidate for the seat of Wellington South in the 1928 general election. He came runner-up to Labour's Robert McKeen who was likewise a city councillor.

Later life and death
In the 1948 Birthday Honours, Luckie was made an Officer of the Order of the British Empire.

Luckie died in Wellington on 3 July 1951.

Notes

References

External links

1868 births
1951 deaths
People educated at Wellington College (New Zealand)
Wellington cricketers
New Zealand cricketers
Cricketers from Nelson, New Zealand
New Zealand cricket administrators
19th-century New Zealand lawyers
New Zealand Officers of the Order of the British Empire
Wellington City Councillors
Deputy mayors of Wellington
Wellington Harbour Board members
Wellington Hospital Board members
Reform Party (New Zealand) politicians
Unsuccessful candidates in the 1928 New Zealand general election
New Zealand sportsperson-politicians
20th-century New Zealand lawyers